Zhu Yanfeng (born March 1961) is a Chinese business executive and politician. He is the president of Dongfeng Motor. Previously he served as the president and chief executive of First Automobile Works (FAW), chairman of the Tianjin Automobile Group, and deputy party chief of Jilin province.

Life and career
Zhu was born in Fenghua, Zhejiang Province in March 1961.  He is the grandson of renowned meteorologist Chu Coching.

He graduated from the Department of Automation at Zhejiang University in August 1983.  1982, he joined the Communist Party of China.

Between 1997 and 1999, Zhu was the Deputy General Manager of China FAW Group Corporation. Between 1999 and 2002, he was promoted to the position of General Manager.   In 2002, Zhu went to Tianjin, became the Chairman of Tianjin Automobile Group until 2006. From 2006 onwards he has been the President of China FAW Group Corporation.

China FAW Group Corporation is the first Chinese automobile producer, before the Chinese Economic Reform, it was long-time the biggest automobile producer. Currently it's also one of the biggest car producers in China.

In 2007, Zhu became the executive vice governor of Jilin Province; in January 2008 he was also named to the Jilin provincial Party Standing Committee. He left his post as vice governor in May 2012, then was named deputy party chief of Jilin.

In May 2015, he left his position as deputy party chief of Jilin, and was named party chief and Chairman of Dongfeng Motor.

Zhu is an alternate member of the 16th, 17th, and 18th Central Committees of the Communist Party of China.

References

External links
 FAW homepage (Chinese)
 FAW homepage (English)
 Zhu Yanfeng in ChinaVitae (English)

1961 births
Living people
Businesspeople from Ningbo
Zhejiang University alumni
People's Republic of China politicians from Zhejiang
Chinese Communist Party politicians from Zhejiang
Political office-holders in Jilin
Politicians from Ningbo
FAW Group people
Dongfeng Motor people
Chinese chief executives in the automobile industry